Shakey Graves (born Alejandro Rose-Garcia; June 4, 1987) is an American Americana musician from Austin, Texas.

His music combines blues, folk, country, and rock and roll. Rose-Garcia received his stage name at Old Settler's Music Festival in 2007 after a stranger, apparently high on LSD, rambled "spooky wagons". Then he and his friends jokingly gave each other Native American guide names over a campfire. After an inspired night of playing music, he decided to keep the name.

History 
Before being known as Shakey Graves, Rose-Garcia had acting roles in Friday Night Lights and the Spy Kids franchise.

Shakey Graves became known for his one-man band set up and most of his 2011 self-released debut album Roll the Bones features him playing solo. This set up originated after he grew tired of having to borrow kick drums and high hats in order to perform. His solution consisted of a modified suitcase that functions as both a kick drum and a tambourine stand built by a close friend.

His unique style of performance led to him being asked to be the official “busker” for the Edward Sharpe and Mumford & Sons Railroad Revival Tour in 2011, where he played music for patrons entering each venue.

His follow-up EP The Donor Blues was released in 2012, and features a collection of recordings from 2009.

After being courted by multiple labels, Shakey Graves signed with Dualtone Records. When he began working on the album, he added other musicians to his recording process and live set, including multi-instrumentalists Patrick O'Connor, Jon Shaw, and Chris Boosahda, who produced the album. Three songs are duets with ex-Paper Bird member Esmé Patterson. The album, titled And the War Came, was released on October 7, 2014.

Shakey Graves then began touring as a three-piece band. The band made their television debut on October 14, 2014, on Conan, and then appeared on the Late Show with David Letterman, performing "Dearly Departed" with Patterson. The band performed their next single, "The Perfect Parts", on Late Night with Seth Meyers. On May 6, 2015, the band performed on Austin City Limits.

In September 2015, Shakey Graves won the Best Emerging Artist award at the 2015 Americana Music Awards.

On February 9, 2012, Lee Leffingwell, the Mayor of Austin, proclaimed a "Shakey Graves Day". Every year on February 9 through the 11th, Shakey Graves offers all of his music, including unreleased albums The State of Texas vs. Alejandro Rose-Garcia, Story of My Life, As Per Request, and West of Calgary on Bandcamp for pay-what-you-want prices.

On June 30, 2017, the band released The Donor Blues and Nobody's Fool as a collection titled Shakey Graves and the Horse He Rode In On on vinyl and streaming services under the Dualtone label.

Shakey Graves released their third studio album, Can't Wake Up, on May 4, 2018, on Dualtone Records.

On May 8, 2020, Shakey Graves released the Look Alive EP

On April 2, 2021, Shakey Graves re-released his debut album Roll the Bones on Dualtone Records for its 10-year anniversary. The album was originally self-released on CD-R. Entitled Roll the Bones X, the re-release includes additional songs not included on the original. The album reached number 136 on the US Billboard 200.

On May 31, 2022, Shakey Graves appeared on Jimmy Kimmel Live! performing "This Town" with Trixie Mattel.

On February 9, 2023, Shakey Graves released Deadstock - A Shakey Graves Day Anthology, an "anthology" of previously unreleased material.

Discography

Studio albums

Compilation albums

EPs
 Donor Blues EP (2012)
 Nobody's Fool (Dualtone, 2015)
 The Sleep EP (2018)
 Night Owl Sessions (2018)
 Look Alive EP (2020)

Singles

As lead artist

As featured artist

Notes

Awards
 Best Emerging Artist — 2015 Americana Music Awards

References

External links

Americana musicians
Musicians from Austin, Texas
Male actors from Texas
One-man bands
Place of birth missing (living people)
Year of birth missing (living people)
Living people
Dualtone Records artists